Crocus nudiflorus is a species of flowering plant in the genus Crocus of the family Iridaceae. It is an autumn-flowering, dwarf, deciduous perennial found in western Europe from southwestern France to Spain. It has been cultivated since Tudor times in Great Britain, where it is now naturalized.

Description
Crocus nudiflorus grows from corms, which spread out into clumps of plants by stolons. Each corm usually sends out one long-tubed, goblet-shaped, or bell-shaped flower. The bloom appears in autumn, or at the end of summer. The colour ranges from deep purple to lilac-purple with a paler throat and bright orange or yellow stigma.
Then the linear, basal leaves, usually with a silvery central stripe, are produced in winter and spring following the autumn flowers, when the fruits appear.

Taxonomy
The Latin specific epithet nudiflorus means 'naked flower', in reference to the flower emerging before the leaves.

It was published and described by James Edward Smith in 'English Botany' Volume 7 on table 491 in 1798.

Distribution and habitat
Crocus nudiflorus is native to southwestern France and Spain.

Habitat
It is found on roadsides, meadows and pastures. It often grows in pastures with other crocus species including Crocus vernus subsp. albiflorus, but it is often eaten by wild boars.

Uses
It has been used in folk medicine as an anti-spasmodic, as an abortive and a sedative.

Culture
In 2002, it was voted by the public as the county flower of Nottinghamshire.

References

nudiflorus
Plants described in 1798
Flora of France
Flora of Spain